Francisco Barnés may refer to:
 Francisco Barnés de Castro (born 1946), Mexican academic and consultant
 Francisco Barnés Salinas (1877–1947), Spanish professor, Republican Left politician and Minister of Education